Félix Marten (1919–1992) was a German-born French film actor. He was born in Remagen to a Finnish father, and his family fled Germany following the Nazi takeover. He is one of a number of actors to play Leslie Charteris's character Simon Templar in the 1960 film Le Saint mène la danse.

Selected filmography

 Dreams of Love (1947)
 Pity for the Vamps (1956)
 Maxime (1958)
 Elevator to the Gallows (1958)
 Nathalie, Secret Agent (1959)
 Le Saint mène la danse (1960)
 It Happened All Night (1960)
 Operation Gold Ingot (1962)
 The Gypsy Baron (1962)
 Diamonds Are a Man's Best Friend (1966)
 Is Paris Burning? (1966)
 Pasha (1968)
 La Horse (1970)
 The Heist (1970)
 Les Raisins de la Mort (1978)

References

Bibliography
 Barer, Burl. The Saint: A Complete History in Print, Radio, Film and Television of Leslie Charteris' Robin Hood of Modern Crime, Simon Templar, 1928-1992. McFarland, 2003.

External links

1919 births
1992 deaths
French male television actors
French male film actors
German male television actors
German male film actors
German emigrants to France
People from Ahrweiler (district)